Lamunière is a French surname. Notable people with the surname include:

 Inès Lamunière (born 1954), Swiss architect and professor
 Simon Lamunière (born 1961), Swiss art curator

French-language surnames